Sina Karimian (born 23 January 1988) is an Iranian kickboxer. He currently competes in K-1, where he is the current K-1 Cruiserweight Champion.

Kickboxing career
Karimian participated in the 2018 K-1 WORLD GP Cruiserweight (−90 kg) Tournament. He beat OD.KEN in the quarter finals with a fourth-round TKO. In the semi finals he defeated K-Jee with a unanimous decision. He won a majority decision against Boubaker El Bakouri with a majority decision to become the inaugural K-1 Cruiserweight champion.

He made his first title defence against Hisaki Kato during K-1 World GP 2019: K’FESTA 2. Karimian won a unanimous decision.

He made his second title defence in a rematch against Ryo Aitaka. Karimian won a unanimous decision.

Karimian fought K-Jee on 3 November 2020 during K-1 WGP Japan. He lost the fight by a first-round knockout.

Sina was scheduled to fight Seiya Tanigawa at K'Festa 4, but the event was later postponed due to the COVID-19 pandemic. He was instead scheduled to fight K-Jee at K'Festa 4 Day 2 for the K-1 WORLD GP Cruiserweight title. Sina won the fight by a second-round knockout, after being knocked down twice in the first round.

Karimian was scheduled to face the former K-1 heavyweight champion Kyotaro Fujimoto at K-1 World GP 2021: Yokohamatsuri on 20 September 2021. He won the fight by split decision, after an extra round was fought.

Karimian faced Rikiya Yamashita at THE MATCH 2022 on 19 June 2022. He won the fight by unanimous decision.

Karimian faced Kosuke Jitsukata at K-1 World GP 2022 Yokohamatsuri on September 11, 2022. He won the fight by a first-round knockout.

Titles and accomplishments

Professional
 2018 K-1 World GP −90 kg Championship Tournament Winner
 2021 K-1 World GP −90 kg Championship (2 Defenses)

Amateur
 WKN Super Cruiserweight International Champion
 WKU Amateur World Heavyweight Champion
 IKN Amateur World Heavyweight Champion
 WKF Amateur World Heavyweight Champion
 2017 IFMA Amateur Muaythai World  Championship (91 kg) 3rd place.

Fight record 

|-  style="background:#cfc"
| 2022-12-03 || Win ||align=left| Carlos Budiao ||  K-1 World GP 2022 in Osaka || Osaka, Japan || DQ (Punch to the back of the head)  ||2 || 
|-  style="background:#cfc;"
| 2022-09-11 || Win ||align=left| Kosuke Jitsukata || K-1 World GP 2022 Yokohamatsuri || Yokohama, Japan || KO (Punches) || 1 || 1:21
|- style="background:#cfc;"
| 2022-06-19 || Win ||align=left| Rikiya Yamashita || THE MATCH 2022 || Tokyo, Japan || Decision (Unanimous) || 3 || 3:00
|-  style="background:#cfc;"
| 2021-09-20 || Win ||align=left| Kyotaro || K-1 World GP 2021: Yokohamatsuri || Yokohama, Japan || Ext. R. Decision (Split) || 4 ||3:00
|- style="background:#cfc;"
| 2021-03-28|| Win ||align=left| K-Jee ||  K'Festa 4 Day 2 || Tokyo, Japan || KO (Spinning back fist) || 2 ||  0:26
|-
! style=background:white colspan=9 |
|- style="background:#fbb;"
| 2020-11-03|| Loss ||align=left| K-Jee ||  K-1 World GP 2020 in Fukuoka || Fukuoka, Japan ||    TKO (corner stoppage) || 1 || 
|-
! style=background:white colspan=9 |
|-  style="background:#cfc;"
| 2020-03-22|| Win ||align=left| Ryo Aitaka || K-1: K’Festa 3 || Saitama, Japan || Decision (Unanimous)|| 3|| 3:00
|-
! style=background:white colspan=9 |
|- style="background:#fbb;"
| 2019-08-24|| Loss ||align=left| Ryo Aitaka || K-1 World GP 2019: Japan vs World 5 vs 5 & Special Superfight in Osaka || Osaka, Japan || KO (Right overhand) || 3 || 2:08
|-  style="background:#cfc;"
| 2019-03-10|| Win ||align=left| Hisaki Kato ||K-1 World GP 2019: K’FESTA 2|| Saitama, Japan ||  Decision (Unanimous) || 3 || 3:00
|-
! style=background:white colspan=9 |
|-  style="background:#cfc;"
| 2018-09-24|| Win ||align=left| Boubaker El Bakouri|| K-1 World GP 2018: inaugural Cruiserweight Championship Tournament, Final || Tokyo, Japan || Decision (Majority) || 3 || 3:00
|-
! style=background:white colspan=9 |
|-  style="background:#cfc;"
| 2018-09-24|| Win ||align=left| K-Jee || K-1 World GP 2018: inaugural Cruiserweight Championship Tournament, Semi Finals || Tokyo, Japan || Decision (Unanimous) || 3 || 3:00
|-  style="background:#cfc;"
| 2018-09-24|| Win ||align=left| OD.KEN || K-1 World GP 2018: inaugural Cruiserweight Championship Tournament, Quarter Finals || Tokyo, Japan || TKO (ref. stop) || 4 || 3:00
|-
| colspan=9 | Legend:    

|-  style="background:#fbb;"
| 2017-05-10|| Loss||align=left| Jakob Klauda || 2017 IFMA World Championships, Semi Final || Minsk, Belarus || RSO || 2 || 
|-
! style=background:white colspan=9 |

|-
| colspan=9 | Legend:

See also 
List of male kickboxers
List of K-1 Events

References

Iranian male kickboxers
Sportspeople from Isfahan
Living people
1988 births